Shiv Kumar Mishra (1916 - 12 December 2007) was born in Unnao, lived in Kanpur, and led the Uttar Pradesh State Committee of Communist Party of India (Marxist) as a member of its Central Committee at the time of the outbreak of the Naxalite movement. Thereafter he sided with Charu Majumdar and played a prominent role in the formation of the Communist Party of India (Marxist-Leninist).

References

External links 
 A Short History of CPI(M-L)
 We mourn the passing away of Comrade Shiv Kumar Mishra

1916 births
Date of birth missing
2007 deaths
Indian communists